Alvin Rettig (born December 6, 1963) is a former Arena football fullback/linebacker in the Arena Football League (AFL). He played college football at Rice University.

In 1998, Rettig was elected into the Arena Football Hall of Fame.

References

1963 births
Living people
American football fullbacks
American football linebackers
Rice Owls football players
Detroit Drive players
Place of birth missing (living people)